These are the Hong Kong Island results of the 1998 Hong Kong legislative election. The election was held on 24 May 1998 and all 4 seats in the newly established Hong Kong Island geographical constituency were contested. The Democratic Party became the biggest winner by taking two seats with Martin Lee and Yeung Sum elected, which followed by Democratic Alliance for the Betterment of Hong Kong's (DAB) Cheng Kai-nam and Citizens Party's Christine Loh.

Overall results
After election:

Candidates list

See also
Legislative Council of Hong Kong
Hong Kong legislative elections
1998 Hong Kong legislative election

References

1998 Hong Kong legislative election